The Fukashiro Dam is a gravity dam in the Sagami River system, located  north of Ōtsuki in Yamanashi Prefecture, Japan. The purpose of the dam is flood control and water supply. Plans for the dam were drawn up in 1978 and construction on the diversion tunnels began in 1996. The dam reached its height in 2001 and in 2003, the reservoir began to fill. By 2004, the entire dam was complete. The dam's main spillway consists of five free overflow openings with a  discharge capacity. To handle additional discharges, there are two additional openings on the dam's orifice and two jet flow openings as part of the outlet works.

See also
Kazunogawa Pumped Storage Power Station – located upstream

References

Dams in Yamanashi Prefecture
Gravity dams
Dams completed in 2004